Jeongdongjin (also Chongdongjin) is a town near Gangneung, South Korea, and one of the most popular sites in Korea for watching the sunrise on New Year's Day. It is eighteen kilometers south-east of Gangneung on the east coast of Korea along the Sea of Japan.

History 

In ancient times, at Jeongdongjin the King held a memorial service for the Dragon King of the four seas. At the beginning of the Korean War, the beach was a landing area for the 766th Independent Infantry Regiment from North Korea. The North Korean submarine from the 1996 Gangneung submarine infiltration incident is on display at Jeongdongjin, which is south-east of An-in beach where it ran aground.

Modern day 

Fishermen sailing from the small harbor catch Pacific saury, abalone and sole. A ceremony asking God to protect the town, combined with ceremonial prayers for a large catch of fish, is held twice a year in Jeongdongjin. The day of the first full moon of the lunar year and Dano are also festive occasions. 

Jeongdongjin is a picturesque area with a quaint railway station alongside the sandy beach. Long a favorite spot among the locals, the area gained wider popularity after being chosen as the filming location for the popular soap opera Moraeshigae (meaning Sandglass) in 1994. 

A key attraction of Jeongdongjin is the sunrise. The early morning sun rising over the ocean and outlining the train station and surrounding pines is a sight that has been described as "straight out of a fairy tale". During the New Year, Jeongdongjin Sunrise Park is the location of the Sunrise Festival and the ceremonial "turning of the hourglass", signifying the changing year.

Overlooking the town is the Sun Cruise Resort & Yacht, a hotel designed to look like a cruise ship.

See also
Jeongdongjin station
Sea Train
Korean New Year

References

External links

 

Gangneung
Tourism in Korea